Ugia viridior is a species of moth in the family Erebidae. It is found on Sumatra and Borneo and in Singapore. The habitat consists of lowland forests.

References

Moths described in 2005
Ugia